An Introduction to... Elliott Smith is a posthumous compilation album by American singer-songwriter Elliott Smith, released on November 2, 2010 by Kill Rock Stars in the United States.

Background 

The press release by Kill Rock Stars described the aim of the compilation's assembly and release:

Larry Crane, Smith's archivist, remixed "Last Call" for this compilation from the 4-track cassette master. "Angel in the Snow" is also a new mix, done later than the version that appears on New Moon. Crane stated "I had used an inferior noise reduction process on New Moon; plus, I now have better tape transfers".

Track listing

References 

Elliott Smith albums
Compilation albums published posthumously
2010 compilation albums
Kill Rock Stars compilation albums
Domino Recording Company compilation albums